Darry Cowl (born André Darricau; 27 August 1925 – 14 February 2006) was a French comedian, actor and musician. He won a César Award for Best Actor in a Supporting Role in 2004 for his role as a concierge in Pas sur la bouche (Not on the lips), which was his last appearance.

He was born in Vittel and came to prominence when he was cast by Sacha Guitry in Assassins et voleurs (1956) (Assassins and Robbers). Following this he turned to acting in cinema roles and soon gained celebrity status with his role as Antoine Péralou in Le Triporteur (1957) (The Tricycle).

A game addict, he often acted only for money in films that did not stretch his acting ability. He explained this by noting he did not read the script (or, on occasion, know the title) of the work in which he was to act.

He played Major Archibald in the 1974 film Don't Touch the White Woman!.

He had hoped to return to theatre acting in Hold Up in September 2005 but ill-health prevented this. At age 80, he died in Neuilly-sur-Seine from complications of lung cancer.

Selected filmography 

 Four Days in Paris (1955) - L'aviculteur
 Les Duraton (1955) - M. Mathieu - le surveillant général
 Maid in Paris (1956) - Daniel, le casseur d'assiettes
 Bonjour sourire (1956) - Le médecin
 Naughty Girl (1956) - Man with Suitcase
 Ces sacrées vacances (1956) - Un voisin
 La joyeuse prison (1956) - Maître Larigot
 Plucking the Daisy (1956) - Hubert Dumont
 Short Head (1956) - Le réceptionniste de l'hôtel
 Paris, Palace Hotel (1956) - Jules Hoyoyo
 Lovers and Thieves (1956) - Jean-Henri Lardenois - le faux témoin
 Les lumières du soir (1956) - (uncredited)
 L'amour descend du ciel (1957) - Dédé
 Love in Jamaica (1957) - Pater Noster
 Cinq millions comptant (1957) - Philémon de Montfilet
 Les 3 font la paire (1957) - Henri Valpreux, le metteur en scène
 L'ami de la famille (1957) - Pierre Bernicaud
 Fric-frac en dentelles (1957) - Le détective amateur
 Les Lavandières du Portugal (1957) - Paul
 On Foot, on Horse, and on Wheels (1957) - Hubert
 Ce joli monde (1957) - Gaston
 Fumée blonde (1957) - Emile Gachit
 Le triporteur (1957) - Antoine Peyralout
 Le naïf aux 40 enfants (1957) - Le marchand d'échelles
 The Lady Doctor (1957) - Egisto
 Le temps des oeufs durs (1958) - Louis Stainval
 Chéri, fais-moi peur (1958) - Jérôme Lenoir
 Be Beautiful But Shut Up (1958) - L'inspecteur Jerome
 School for Coquettes (1958) - Gégène
 A Dog, a Mouse, and a Sputnik (1958) - Hubert
 Le petit prof (1959) - Jérôme Aubin
 Archimède le clochard (1959) - Arsène
 The Indestructible (1959) - Hippolyte
 Vous n'avez rien à déclarer? (1959) - Labaule
 Les affreux (1959) - Fernand Mouchette
 Monsieur Robinson Crusoe (1960) - Antoine Peyralout
 Bouche cousue (1960) - Martin
 Les pique-assiette (1960) - Edouard
 Love and the Frenchwoman (1960) - Dr. Dufieux (segment "Enfance, L'")
 Les fortiches (1961) - Riri et JoJo
 Les amours de Paris (1961) - Gimenez
 Un Martien à Paris (1961) - Pierre Dubois
 Les moutons de Panurge (1961) - Charles Renard
 Les livreurs (1961) - Édouard
 The Lions Are Loose (1961) - Richard (uncredited)
 Tales of Paris (1962) - Hubert Parker (segment "Ella")
 Girl on the Road (1962) - Le journaliste
 Tartarin de Tarascon (1962) - L'homme en panne dans le désert
 Les Bricoleurs (1963) - Félix
 L'abominable homme des douanes (1963) - Campo Santos
 People in Luck (1963) - Simon Taquet (segment "Une nuit avec une vedette")
 Strip Tease (1963) - Paul
 Les Saintes-Nitouches (1963)
 Le bon roi Dagobert (1963) - Le maître- bourreau Richardic
 Salad by the Roots (1964) - Gratiopoulos
 Jealous as a Tiger  (1964) - Henri
 The Gorillas (1964) - Edouard
 Les gros bras (1964) - Ludovic Gabasse
 I magnifici brutos del West (1964) - Jackson
 Les baratineurs (1965) - César Brandini
 Déclic et des claques (1965) - Un invité
 La bonne occase (1965) - Le polytechnicien
 The Double Bed (1965) - Le frère de la fiancée (segment 3 "La répétition")
 La tête du client (1965) - L'agent André
 Les Bons Vivants (1965) - L'avocat de la défense (Léonard) (segment "Le procès")
 Up to His Ears (1965) - Biscoton
 Les combinards (1966) - Léo
 Les malabars sont au parfum (1966) - Cassius 0001
 Your Money or Your Life (1966) - Marquy
 Le grand bidule (1967) - Barratier
 Ces messieurs de la famille (1968) - Albert Pelletier
 Salut Berthe! (1968) - Didier
 Le bourgeois gentil mec (1969) - Perrugo
 Poussez pas grand-père dans les cactus (1969) - Doctor Biraque
 Ces messieurs de la gâchette (1970) - Albert Pelletier
 Elle cause plus, elle flingue (1972) - Le commissaire Adrien Bondu
 L'Heptaméron (Joyeux compères) (1973) - L'apothicaire
 Don't Touch the White Woman! (1974) - Maj. Archibald
 La gueule de l'emploi (1974) - Le patron de l'Arquebuse
 Y'a un os dans la moulinette (1974) - Gaston
 C'est jeune et ça sait tout! (1974) - Le livreur
 Trop c'est trop (1975) - Lucifer
 Le jour de gloire (1976) - Le curé
 Arrête ton char... bidasse! (1977) - Colonel Lessard
 Un oursin dans la poche (1977) - Howard Bachs
 Général... nous voilà! (1978) - Le Père Blanc
 Les Borsalini (1980) - Pépé
 Voulez-vous un bébé Nobel? (1980) - Professor Joseph Menzano
 Les surdoués de la première compagnie (1981) - Colonel Boussardon
 Le bahut va craquer (1981) - Le prof de maths
 T'es folle ou quoi? (1982) - Himself
 Pour cent briques, t'as plus rien... (1982) - Le concierge flic
 On s'en fout... nous on s'aime (1982) - Le père de Julien
 Qu'est-ce qui fait craquer les filles... (1982) - The journalist
 Deux heures moins le quart avant Jésus-Christ (1982) - Faucuius
 Ça va pas être triste (1983) - Jack Renard, the Mayor
 On l'appelle Catastrophe (1983) - Le juge d'instruction
 Mon curé chez les Thaïlandaises (1983) - Tête-de-fer, le pirate
 Le téléphone sonne toujours deux fois!! (1985) - L'agent de police
 Liberté, égalité, choucroute (1985) - Rouget de l'Isle
 Suivez mon regard (1986) - Le cafetier
 Les Saisons du plaisir (1988) - Daniel D.
 Une nuit à l'Assemblée Nationale (1988) - Kayser
 Ville à vendre (1992) - Emilio Bingo - le vétérinaire
 Les Misérables (1995) - Le bouquiniste / Bookseller
 Ma femme me quitte (1996) - Stéphane Lasser
 Straight into the Wall (1997) - Le patient
 Augustin, King of Kung-Fu (1999) - René
 Drug Scenes (2000)
 Le nouveau Jean-Claude (2002) - Jeff
 If I Were a Rich Man (2002) - M. Sylvain
 Les Marins perdus (2003) - Falco
 Not on the Lips (2003) - Madame Foin
 Le Cou de la girafe (2004) - Léo
 Les Dalton (2004) - Le Vieil Homme
 L'homme qui rêvait d'un enfant (2006) - Jules K.
 La vie privée (2006) - Mr. Mellifond (final film role)

External links 

  Darry Cowl official website
 
  Nanarland.com
  Le coin du cinéphage

1925 births
2006 deaths
20th-century French male actors
21st-century French male actors
20th-century French musicians
Deaths from lung cancer in France
People from Vosges (department)
French male film actors
French male television actors
French male stage actors
French male comedians
People from Hauts-de-Seine
Best Supporting Actor César Award winners
César Honorary Award recipients